Hanza (also Romanized as Hanzā; also known as Hamza) is a village in Anduhjerd Rural District, Shahdad District, Kerman County, Kerman Province, Iran. At the 2006 census, its population was 68, in 17 families.

References 

Populated places in Kerman County